Steve Dunn may refer to:

Steve Dunn (1990s first baseman) (born 1970), Major League Baseball player
Steve Dunn (1880s first baseman) (1858–1933), Major League Baseball player
Steve Dunn (referee) (born 1957), English football referee
Steve Dunn (civil servant), Director General of the Pacific Islands Forum Fisheries Agency, 2004–2006
Stephen Dunne (actor) (1918–1977), American actor sometimes credited as Steve Dunn

See also 
 Steven Dunn or Steve Doll (1960–2009), American professional wrestler
 Stephen Dunn (disambiguation)
 Stephen Dunne (disambiguation)